Kratochvíl (feminine form: Kratochvílová) is a Czech and Slovak surname. Notable people with the surname include:

 Antonin Kratochvil (born 1947), Czech-born American photojournalist
 Jan Kratochvíl (born 1959), Czech mathematician
 Gabriela Kratochvílová (born 1990), Czech model
 Jarmila Kratochvílová (born 1951), Czech 400 m runner
 Josef Kratochvíl (1905–1984), Czechoslovak footballer
 Josef Kratochvíl, Czech civil servant
 Josef Kratochvíl (1909–1992), Czech zoologist
 Martin Kratochvíl (born 1946), Czech jazz musician 
 Michel Kratochvil (born 1979), Swiss tennis player
 Karel Kratochvíl (born 1982), Czech footballer
 Michal Kratochvíl, Slovak water polo player
 Miloš Kratochvíl (born 1996), Czech footballer
 Monika Kratochvílová (born 1974), Czech tennis player
 Roman Kratochvíl (born 1974), Slovak footballer
 Tomáš Kratochvíl (born 1971), Czech race walker

See also
 Kratochwil, German spelling of the same surname

Czech-language surnames
Slovak-language surnames